Elizabeth Sinclair Miller (born 27 February 1957) is a British physician, surgeon, campaigner and writer noted for her outspoken stance on mental health, and bipolar disorder (manic depression) in particular. Although she has a long history of television and radio appearances, she came to public prominence in Stephen Fry's Emmy Award-winning documentary The Secret Life of the Manic Depressive in 2006. In 2008 she was voted Mind Champion of the Year by public poll.

Biography
The daughter of a gerontologist and a theatre nurse, Miller is the third generation of her family to become a physician. A difficult child by her own admission, she managed to persuade her parents to send her to Cheltenham Ladies' College at the age of eleven. From there she went to the University of London, graduating from King's College in 1979. After marriage to Richard Armstrong in 1995 she assumed his surname until separation in 1999. She suffered from a series of bipolar breakdowns, and now campaigns on behalf of the mentally ill.

Career
She began surgical training in 1982 and her Fellowship of the Royal College of Surgeons was conferred in 1983, whereupon she began training as a neurosurgeon. That same year, she developed several malignant melanomas, and believes she might not have received treatment in time had she not been a surgeon. Over the course of the next few years she published several academic papers, and in 1989 was Cheyne Medal runner-up for her paper "The Hypothalamic Control of sodium metabolism and the Syndrome of Inappropriate Natriuresis". The stress of her career, being the only female neurosurgeon in the UK at the time caused her to have a hypomanic episode while practising in Edinburgh that same year. She was sectioned for six months, after which she suffered from depression. She said that this experience gave her the lasting insight that people with severe mental illness are best considered 'damaged; not ill'. "If I have learnt one thing, it is that the brain heals if you give it what it needs to heal."

In 1990 she returned to work in Bedford General Hospital, transferring to Guy's Hospital, London in 1991 to work in Accident and Emergency. In 1992 she had a second mental breakdown and was admitted to the Maudsley Hospital, part of King's College. After a year working as a medical adviser in the software industry she took an Art Foundation Diploma at the Byam Shaw School of Art.

In 1994 she was made a Member of the Royal College of General Practitioners but had her third breakdown shortly afterwards. She was admitted to the Bethlem Health Care workers Unit at the Royal Bethlem Hospital, Shirley, London. It was here that she met other physicians who were later to form the Doctors Support Network. In 1996 she started work with the Manic Depression Fellowship, and formed the Doctors Support Network with Dr Soames Michelson. She continued her academic career on a part-time basis, gaining a BA in Psychology from the Open University in 2001 and an MSc in Organisational Psychology from Birkbeck College, University of London. She was awarded a Diploma in Occupational Health in 2002 whilst treating London Fire Brigade personnel for mental health issues. It was in this latter post that she began her work on Mood Mapping.

Mood Mapping
Miller's first book, Mood Mapping, was published in the autumn of 2009. It is a practical book, guiding the reader to emotional health and happiness.

Awards
1989, Cheyne Medal runner up
2005, Nominee, Mental Health Survivor Award
2008, Mind Champion of the Year

Major publications

Miller E.S., Collins I., Seckl J.R. Hyponatraemia following subarachnoid hemorrhage: Sodium loss or fluid gain? Journal of Clinical Sciences (abstract) 1987.
Miller E.S., Dias P. Uttley D. Subdural empyema; A review of 24 cases. Journal of Neurology, Neurosurgery and Psychiatry. 1987;50:1415–1418.
Miller E.S., Dias P. Uttley D. A review of one hundred cases of intracranial suppuration managed since the introduction of computerised tomography. British Journal of Neurosurgery 1988;3:105–108

Miller Lizzie Career focus Helping troubled doctors BMJ 2002;324:148

Academic qualifications
1977, AKC
1979, MBBS King's College, University of London
1983, Fellow of the Royal College of Surgeons of Edinburgh (FRCS(Ed))
1993, Art Foundation Diploma, Byam Shaw School of Art
1994, Member of the Royal College of General Practitioners (MRCPG)
2001, BA, Psychology, Open University
2002, Diploma of Occupational Medicine
2005, MSc, Organisational Psychology, Birkbeck College, University of London

References

1957 births
Living people
Alumni of King's College London
Associates of King's College London
People from Bedford
Fellows of the Royal College of Surgeons
Alumni of the Open University
Alumni of the Byam Shaw School of Art
People with bipolar disorder